Vix is a given name. It can refer to a shortened version of Victoria or Victor or variations thereof. Vix may also refer to:

Places 
 Vix, Côte-d'Or
 Vix Grave of the Lady of Vix
 Vix, Vendée

Others 
 VIX, ticker symbol for the Chicago Board Options Exchange Volatility Index, sometimes referred to as the "Fear Index"
 Eurico de Aguiar Salles Airport, IATA code VIX
 Vitória, Brazil, also known as Vix
 Vienna Internet Exchange
 Vix (Victoria Perks), the lead singer of UK pop-punk band We've Got a Fuzzbox and We're Gonna Use It
 Vix Technology, an Australian-based technology company
 The VIX API from VMware allows automated management of virtualized computers
 Vix.com, a website formerly known as Batanga Media
 Vix Note, sent in the 1910s from Fernand Vix to the Hungarian Government
 Vix (streaming service) (ViX), a Spanish-language video streaming service owned by TelevisaUnivision

See also 
 Vixen (disambiguation)